The Chief Minister of Jammu and Kashmir was the title given to the head of government of Jammu and Kashmir. As per the Constitution of India, the Lieutenant Governor is the state's de jure head, but de facto executive authority rests with the chief minister. Following elections to the Jammu and Kashmir Legislative Assembly, the Lieutenant Governor usually invites the party (or coalition) with a majority of seats to form the government. The Lieutenant Governor appoints the chief minister, whose council of ministers are collectively responsible to the assembly.

The post was established after the 6th amendment to the state's constitution (effective 6 June 1965) abolished the title of Prime Minister of Jammu and Kashmir. Subsequently, the ruling prime minister, Ghulam Mohammed Sadiq, was sworn in as the first Chief Minister of Jammu and Kashmir. The State of Jammu and Kashmir was reorganised into a union territory on 31 October 2019.

The office of Chief Minister of Jammu and Kashmir has been vacant since 20 June 2018. Until 19 December 2018 the state was under Governor's rule, and then under President's rule until 30 October 2019. After the state was reorganised into a Union territory in October 2019, the President's rule was discharged via the Lieutenant Governor. Currently, the Lieutenant Governor of Jammu and Kashmir serves as the head of government of union territory of Jammu and Kashmir until a new chief minister is in place following the next Jammu and Kashmir Legislative Assembly election.

Prime Ministers of Jammu and Kashmir (1947–1965)

Before Merger with India   
 Colour key for parties

Chief Ministers of the state of Jammu and Kashmir (1965-2019) 
Colour key for parties

Chief  Ministers of union territory of Jammu and Kashmir (2019-present)

See also
 Deputy Chief Minister of Jammu and Kashmir

Notes

References

 
Jammu and Kashmir
Chief Ministers